The rough-crested malkoha (Dasylophus superciliosus) is a species of cuckoo in the family Cuculidae. It is endemic to Luzon Island in the Philippines. Its natural habitat is  tropical moist lowland forest.

Description
Large, with long tail and unique crest, sexes similar, races differ in that cagayanensis is smaller with less extensive and shorter superciliary crest and with olive wash on underparts compared to superciliosus. And upperparts, wings, and tail black with bluish green gloss; superciliary or eyebrow composed of long, loosely webbed red feathers running from lores to nape; graduated tail feathers tipped white; underparts black with dull greenish tinge.

Subspecies 
Two subspecies are recognized

 D.s. superciliosus: Southern Luzon; red wattle and longer crest
 D. s. cagayanesis:  Northern Luzon; yellow wattle and short crest

References

 BirdLife International 2004.  Phaenicophaeus superciliosus.   2006 IUCN Red List of Threatened Species.   Downloaded on 24 July 2007.

rough-crested malkoha
Birds of Luzon
rough-crested malkoha
rough-crested malkoha
Taxonomy articles created by Polbot